Eugene McEntegart (born 1968) is an Irish former professional rugby league footballer who played in the 1990s and early 2000s. He played at representative level for Ireland, and at club level for Dublin Blues.

International honours
Eugene McEntegart won a cap for Ireland while at Dublin Blues 1995 1-cap.

References

1968 births
Living people
Ireland national rugby league team players
Irish rugby league players
Place of birth missing (living people)
Rugby league players from County Dublin